Holy Trinity Church stands in a country lane near the hamlet of Howgill, between Sedbergh and Tebay, Cumbria, England.  It is an active Anglican church in the deanery of Kendal, the archdeaconry of Westmorland and the Anglican Diocese of Carlisle.  The church is recorded in the National Heritage List for England as a designated Grade II listed building.

History
The church was built in 1838 to a design by the Lancaster architect Edmund Sharpe.  It replaced a small chapel on the other side of Chapel Back that dated back to about 1685.  The main person responsible for its creation was Revd Isaac Green, the second master at Sedbergh School, and incumbent of the parish.  The land was given by Stephen Sedgwick.  The new church was consecrated on 29 October 1838 by the Rt Revd Charles Longley, Bishop of Ripon.

Architecture
Holy Trinity Church has a simple design in Early English style; it is built in rubble with sandstone dressings and has a slate roof.  Its plan consists of a nave with a short chancel.  The west front is gabled with buttresses at the corners; it contains three windows and a doorway, above which is a bellcote.  On both the north and south sides are six lancet windows, with a buttress between the first and second windows from the west on each side.  The chancel is slightly lower than the nave.  It has one window on each side, and a triple lancet window at the east end.  Internally there is a west gallery, box pews and a panelled font.

See also

Listed buildings in Sedbergh
List of architectural works by Edmund Sharpe

References

Church of England church buildings in Cumbria
Grade II listed churches in Cumbria
Gothic Revival church buildings in England
Gothic Revival architecture in Cumbria
Churches completed in 1838
19th-century Church of England church buildings
Anglican Diocese of Leeds
Edmund Sharpe buildings